Michael Jacobson may refer to:

Michael F. Jacobson (born 1943), co-founder of the Center for Science in the Public Interest
Michael P. Jacobson (born 1953), founder and director of the Institute for State and Local Governance at the City University of New York
Michael Scott Jacobson, mathematician
Michael Jacobson (athlete) (born 1997), American football and basketball player
Michael Jacobson, investigator who compiled "File 17", which became the basis for The 28 Pages
Michael Jacobson (born 1973), the asemic writing writer
Mike Jacobson, politician and member of the Nebraska Legislature